The scientific name Xylococcus may refer to:

 Xylococcus (insect), a scale insect genus 
 Xylococcus (plant), a plant genus